Umid Ali Junejo railway station 
() is  located in Village Umeed Ali Junejo in Qambar Shahdadkot District.

After 2010 Floods
Most of the Railway Stations have been deserted and are occupied by the flood affected poor people who have made them as their shelter due to severe poverty.

See also
 List of railway stations in Pakistan
 Pakistan Railways

References

External links

Railway stations in Qambar Shahdadkot District